The Hero of the Patriotic War is the highest title in Azerbaijan. The title was created by the law "Regulations on the title of "Hero of the Patriotic War" of the Republic of Azerbaijan" dated 26 November 2020 and the decree of the President of Azerbaijan, Ilham Aliyev dated 1 December 2020. It was established on the occasion of Azerbaijan being the victor in the Second Nagorno-Karabakh War. Its recipient is also awarded with the Hero of the Patriotic War Medal.

The title of Hero of the Patriotic War is conferred by the President of Azerbaijan on his own initiative, or on the proposal of the Ministry of Defence, the Ministry of Internal Affairs, the State Border Service, the State Security Service, and the Foreign Intelligence Service of Azerbaijan. This title can only be awarded once. The Heroes of the Patriotic War enjoy the benefits established by law.

History

Awarding 
On 9 December, the President of Azerbaijan, Ilham Aliyev signed a decree to award 83 servicemen, 34 of them posthumously with the title of the Hero of the Patriotic War. The awardees included Hikmat Mirzayev, the commander of the special forces, Ilham Mehdiyev, the deputy chief of the State Border Service, as well as the officers Namig Islamzadeh, Kanan Seyidov, and Zaur Mammadov.

Status 
The title of Hero of the Patriotic War is the highest title in Azerbaijan. Previously, the title of National Hero of Azerbaijan was the highest title in the country. The title is awarded for "military merits in the complete defeat of the enemy, as well as high professionalism in the management of military operations or personal heroism in the restoration of the state borders of Azerbaijan". The Hero of the Patriotic War is awarded a special distinction, the Hero of the Patriotic War Medal.

Recipients
 Hikmat Mirzayev, Commander of the Special Forces of Azerbaijan.
 Namig Islamzadeh, garrison commander in the "N" military unit of the Azerbaijani Air Force in Kurdamir District.
 Zaur Mammadov, the first commandant of Shusha after its capture.
 Ilham Mehdiyev, lieutenant general, and the deputy head of the Azerbaijani State Border Service.
 Ramiz Gasimov, lieutenant colonel of the Azerbaijani Air Forces.

References 

Orders, decorations, and medals of Azerbaijan
Honorary titles of Azerbaijan
Hero
Awards established in 2020
 
2020 establishments in Azerbaijan
Hero (title)